Konakanamitla is a village in Prakasam district of the Indian state of Andhra Pradesh. It is the mandal headquarters of Konakanamitla mandal in Kandukur revenue division.

Now Konakalamitla is developing very fast. You Can get all services including Digital Marketin Training and Services offered by wingseduserve

Geography 

References 

Villages in Prakasam district